Farrar, Straus and Giroux (FSG) is an American book publishing company, founded in 1946 by Roger Williams Straus Jr. and John C. Farrar. FSG is known for publishing literary books, and its authors have won numerous awards, including Pulitzer Prizes, National Book Awards, and Nobel Prizes.  the publisher is a division of Macmillan, whose parent company is the German publishing conglomerate Holtzbrinck Publishing Group.

Founding 
Farrar, Straus, and Company was founded in 1945 by Roger W. Straus Jr. and John C. Farrar. The first book was Yank: The G.I. Story of the War, a compilation of articles that appeared in Yank, the Army Weekly, then There Were Two Pirates, a novel by James Branch Cabell.

The first years of existence were rough until they published the diet book Look Younger, Live Longer by Gayelord Hauser in 1950. The book went on to sell 500,000 copies and Straus said that the book carried them along for a while. In the early years, Straus and his wife Dorothea, went prospecting for books in Italy. It was there that they found the memoir Christ Stopped at Eboli by Carlo Levi and other rising Italian authors: Alberto Moravia, Giovanni Guareschi and Cesare Pavese. Farrar, Straus also poached or lured away authors from other publishers—one was Edmund Wilson, who was unhappy with Random House at the time but remained with Farrar, Straus for the remainder of his career.

In 1950, the name changed to Farrar, Straus & Young (for Stanley Young, a playwright, author (at Farrar & Rinehart), a literary critic for The New York Times, and an original stockholder and board member).

Merger 
In  1953, Pellegrini & Cudahy merged with Farrar, Straus & Young.

Robert Giroux joined the company in 1955, and after he later became a partner, the name was changed to Farrar, Straus and Giroux. Giroux had been working for Harcourt and had been angered when Harcourt refused to allow him to publish Salinger's Catcher in the Rye. Giroux brought many literary authors with him including Thomas Merton, John Berryman, Robert Lowell, Flannery O'Connor, Jack Kerouac, Peter Taylor, Randall Jarrell, T.S. Eliot, and Bernard Malamud. Alan Williams described Giroux's "Pied Piper sweep" as "almost certainly the greatest number of authors to follow, on their own initiative, a single editor from house to house in the history of modern publishing." In 1964, Straus named Giroux chairman of the board and officially added Giroux's name to the publishing company.

Sale 
Straus continued to run the company for twenty years after his partner Farrar died, until 1993 when he sold a majority interest of the company to the privately owned German publishing conglomerate Georg von Holtzbrinck Publishing Group. Straus offered FSG to the Holtzbrinck family because of their reputation for publishing serious works of literature.

21st century 
Jonathan Galassi served as both president and publisher until 2018. Andrew Mandel joined in 2004 as deputy publisher. Eric Chinski is editor-in-chief. In 2008, Mitzi Angel came from Fourth Estate in the UK to be publisher of the Faber and Faber Inc. imprint. In 2018, Angel succeeded Galassi as publisher, and was named president in 2021. Other notable editors include Sean McDonald, Daphne Durham, and Alex Star.

In February 2015 FSG and Faber and Faber announced the end of their partnership. All books scheduled for release and previously released under the imprint will be moved to the FSG colophon by August 2016.

Name history 
 Farrar, Straus, and Company (1945–1951)
 Farrar, Straus and Young (1950–1956)
 Farrar, Straus and Cudahy (1953–1963) – acquired L.C. Page & Co. in 1957
 Farrar, Straus, and Company (1963–1964) after Cudahy left the firm.
 Farrar, Straus and Giroux (1964–present)

Current imprints 
 MCD/FSG, which is viewed as a kind of a lab to experiment with new styles and genres. The imprint is headed by Sean McDonald, who is joined by Daphne Durham, formerly editor-in-chief and publisher of Amazon Publishing, as executive director.
 FSG Originals
 Hill and Wang publishes books of academic interest and specializes in history. Its authors include Roland Barthes, William Cronon, Langston Hughes, and Elie Wiesel.
 North Point Press published literary nonfiction with an emphasis on natural history, travel, ecology, music, food, and cultural criticism. Its authors include Peter Matthiessen, Beryl Markham, Guy Davenport, A. J. Liebling, Margaret Visser, Wendell Berry, and M. F. K. Fisher.

Former imprints 
 Sarah Crichton Books publishes books with a slightly commercial bent. The imprint launched with Cathleen Falsani's The God Factor in 2006. Ishmael Beah's A Long Way Gone was a bestseller and a Starbucks-featured book in 2007.
 Faber and Faber Inc. published a backlist of drama and books on the arts, entertainment, music, pop culture, cultural criticism, and the media. Its authors included David Auburn, Margaret Edson, Doug Wright, Richard Greenberg, Tom Stoppard, David Hare, Neil LaBute, Peter Conrad, Martin Eisenstadt and Courtney Love.
 Scientific American / FSG, led by Amanda Moon, publishes non-fiction popular science books for the general reader. Its authors include Jesse Bering, Daniel Chamovitz, Kevin Dutton, and Caleb Scharf.
 Noonday Press
Melanie Kroupa Books (children's book imprint, 2000-2008)

Bibliography

Books for Young Readers 
FSG Books for Young Readers publishes National Book Award winners Madeleine L'Engle (1980), William Steig (1983), Louis Sachar (1998), and Polly Horvath (2003). Books for Young Readers also publishes Natalie Babbitt, Roald Dahl, Jack Gantos, George Selden, Uri Shulevitz, Ozge Samanci, and Peter Sis.

Awards

Notable authors

Staff 
Jack Kerouac's then-girlfriend Joyce Johnson, started work in 1957, when Sheila Cudahy was a partner at the firm.

References

Further reading

External links 
 
 
 Farrar, Straus and Giroux Books for Young Readers
 Work in Progress, an Online Magazine by Farrar, Straus and Giroux
 Farrar, Straus & Giroux Collection of Isaac Bashevis Singer Papers at the Harry Ransom Center at the University of Texas at Austin
 

 
Book publishing companies based in New York (state)
Publishing companies based in New York City
Publishing companies established in 1946
1946 establishments in New York (state)
Holtzbrinck Publishing Group